Patrick Huckle (born November 4, 1983) is a German former footballer who played as a left-back.

External links
 
 
 

1983 births
Living people
German footballers
SV Elversberg players
SSV Ulm 1846 players
Kickers Offenbach players
SC Preußen Münster players
SV Waldhof Mannheim players
Rot-Weiss Essen players
FSV Frankfurt players
3. Liga players
FC Nöttingen players
Association football fullbacks
Footballers from Karlsruhe
21st-century German people